William Henry Hamilton Rogers (1 October 1834 – 20 November 1913), Fellow of the Society of Antiquaries of London (FSA), (works published as "W.H. Hamilton Rogers"), of Ridgeway Row in Colyton, Devon, was an English historian and antiquarian who specialised in the West Country of England. He frequently worked with the illustrator Roscoe Gibbs.

List of publications
Bells of Memory, 1862
The Spirit of the Minor Prophets Metrically Rendered, 1865
The Ancient Sepulchral Effigies and Monumental and Memorial Sculpture of Devon, Exeter, 1877
archive.org text
The Fate of Clifton-Maubank, 1888
Memorials of the West, Historical and Descriptive, Collected on the Borderland of Somerset, Dorset and Devon, Exeter, 1888
archive.org text
List of chapters: Beer and its Quarry; John Prince, the Devonshire Biographer; The fate of Clifton-Maubank (Horsey); Augustus Mantague Toplady: His Home in Devon; A Seventeenth Century Bellfounder; Two Georgian Secretaries-at-War (Yonge); The Shrine of an Old Freemason; The Cradle of Marlborough; The Founder and Foundress of Wadham; A Tudor Baron and Earl (Daubeney); Memories of the Vale of Coly; The Cistercian at the Source of Culm; The Nest of Carew (Ottery-Mohun); Traditions of Colcombe (Courtenay and Pole); Axmouth and Bindon;
The Strife of the Roses & Days of the Tudors in the West, Exeter, 1890.
on-line text, freefictionbooks
on-line text, with images, Project Gutenburg
archive.org text
List of chapters:  1: "Our Steward of Household", Robert, Lord Willoughby de Broke, KG; 2: Extinct for the White Rose, William Lord Bonville, KG; 3: Under the Hoof of the White Boar, Henry Stafford, 2nd Duke of Buckingham, KG; 4: Unhorsed at Bosworth, John, Lord Cheyney, KG; 5: "With the Silver Hand",Stafford of Suthwyke, Archbishop and Earl; 6:  "They did Cast him", Sir Thomas Arundell, KB; 7: Of the Imperial Line, Theodoro Paleologus.                                      183
Maps and plans of old Southampton, Southampton, Southampton record Society, vol.3
Wanderings in Devon
Chapters include: Beer and its Quarry; The Nest of the Mohuns and Carews; The Cradle of Marlborough; The Founder of Wadham; John Prince the Devonshire Biographer; Toplady and his Devonshire home; The great House, Colyton, and Who Lived There; Dunkeswell Abbey and its Founder; Colcombe and the Devonshire Antiquary; Axmouth and its Landslip.
West-Country Stories and Sketches: Biographical and Historical,  1895 
Archaeological Papers Relating to the Counties of Somerset, Willts, Hants and Devon, Published by Barnicott and Pearce, Athenaeum Press, 1902

Further reading
Devon & Cornwall Notes & Queries, Vol. VIII, Jan.1914-Oct.1915, Exeter, 1915, pp. 1–2, Obituary

References

External links
 
 

1823 births
1913 deaths
Fellows of the Society of Antiquaries of London
Historians of Devon